The Similitude of a Dream is the second studio album by progressive rock supergroup The Neal Morse Band, released on November 11, 2016. It is a concept album, loosely based on The Pilgrim's Progress by John Bunyan and follows Christian, who is tormented by spiritual anguish and told he must leave the City of Destruction to find salvation in the Celestial City.

The album was released as a two-CD package, a special edition with a bonus making of DVD, and as a triple vinyl version.

Background and writing
Morse began writing in December 2015 and started researching The Pilgrim's Progress when he thought he needed some direction and presented his idea to the band one month later. As the band began working on the album, Mike Portnoy was adamant that the album be a single disc whereas Morse felt there was much more to the story that needed to be explored. Morse wrote additional material to complete a second disc and as the band was finishing the album, Mike Portnoy told the band, "we just made the album of our careers.". Portnoy later made these comments public when the album was announced saying, "Neal and I have now made 18 studio albums together, and I consider 'The Similitude Of A Dream' the absolute creative pinnacle of our collaborations together, after a career of almost 50 albums, I honestly consider this to be one of the defining works of my career". These comments caused much excitement and anticipation in the prog rock community.

The band released five videos in support of the album release. Long Day/Overture, City of Destruction, So Far Gone, The Ways of the Fool, and The Man in the Iron Cage.

Track listing

Personnel
The Neal Morse Band
 Neal Morse – lead vocals, keyboards, 6 & 12 string electric guitars, percussion, mandolin
 Mike Portnoy – drums, vocals
 Randy George – bass and bass pedals
 Bill Hubauer – organ, piano, synthesizers, lead vocals
 Eric Gillette – lead and rhythm electric guitar, lead vocals

Special guests
 Chris Carmichael – violin, viola, and cello
 Eric Darken – percussion ("Breath of Angels")
 Ann, Alfreda and Regina McCrary – background vocals ("Breath of Angels")
 Sarah Hubauer – baritone and alto saxophone ("Overture")
 Spencer McKee – marimba ("The Battle")
 Dave Buzard – stomps ("City of Destruction")
 Bruce Babad – saxophone ("Shortcut to Salvation")
 Steve Herrman – trumpets ("I'm Running")
 Jim Hoke – tenor and baritone saxophone ("I'm Running")
 Rich Mouser – pedal steel

Technical personnel
 Rich Mouser - mixing

Critical reception 

The Similitude of a Dream was received with high praise, being honored as "Album of the Year" (2016) by several online music magazines, including Prog Radio, The Prog Report, The Fire Note, and Rock at Night.

The Prog Report said, "‘The Similitude of a Dream’ does the impossible and exceeds all expectations.  It is absolutely a jaw-dropping release that will no doubt rank alongside the best albums by Neal Morse and Mike Portnoy, if not above them." Two years later, in 2018, The Prog Report ranked Similitude of a Dream as the all time best album in the Neal Morse discography.

Sonic Perspectives added, "'Epic' doesn’t begin to describe what these five musicians have managed to pull off here. It is a fantastic progressive rock opus in the best tradition of the finest prog of the 70s and is an album that I find tremendously satisfying, both spiritually and musically. It has everything any prog fan can ask for and then some, it is really the prog fan’s wet dream."

Charts

References

2016 albums
Music based on novels
Neal Morse albums
Concept albums